Moresby is a rural town and locality in the Cassowary Coast Region, Queensland, Australia.

Geography 
The town is north of centre within the locality. It is bounded in the north-east by the Moresby River, in the south-east by its tributary Little Moresby Creek and in the south by its tributary Boobah Creek.

The Bruce Highway traverses the locality from south to north, passing through the town. The North Coast railway line traverses the locality from the south-west to the north-west, passing to the west of the town, but there is no railway station within the locality. There are sugarcane tramways in the locality.

Most of the land in the locality is flat and low-lying (10 metres about sea level) and is used for crops, principally sugarcane. The land in the far west of the locality rises up toward peaks in neighbouring Basilisk; the lower levels are used for grazing while the upper levels are not cleared.

History 
The town takes its name from the Moresby Range, which was named by explorer George Elphinstone Dalrymple after hydrographer Captain John Moresby of HMS Basilisk.

Moresby State School opened on 31 August 1915. It closed on 9 September 2014.

In the  the locality of Moresby had a population of 149 people.

References

External links 
 

Towns in Queensland
Cassowary Coast Region
Localities in Queensland